In the UK body piercing is an unregulated industry and only requires the studio to be registered with the environmental health Department of their local Council. In addition, there are rules which prohibit or recommendations not to use some forms of anaesthetics. There are also, unlike tattooing, no minimum age requirements for the pierce, although professional Body Piercers will act responsibly. In some areas of London there are voluntary codes about minimum ages, but this varies from borough to borough.

There are not any regulations covering the training of body piercers. It is suggested people do a lot of research into this area and only go to those schools which are recommended from within the industry, have a good track record, are long established, and preferably allowed membership of a professional association once the course is successfully completed. There are also no regulations covering those who teach body piercing. Body Piercing is not in the Life Long Skills Sector.

Considered regulation
The Cosmetic Piercing (Age of Consent) (Wales) Bill was announced by the First Minister for introduction during the 5 year legislative programme in 2011.

A consultation to get views on how to make cosmetic piercing safer for young people began 18 October 2011 and closed 31 January 2012 in Wales. The lead petitioner was Russell Spencer-Downe, a father of two and a town councillor and past mayor from Llantwit Major, Vale of Glamorgan, who campaigned for a change in law.

References

External links
 website of The Association of Professional Piercers (International)
 Ear Piercing

Body piercing
British culture
British fashion
Law of the United Kingdom
Health law in the United Kingdom